The 2017 CAF Super Cup (officially the 2017 Total CAF Super Cup for sponsorship reasons) was the 25th CAF Super Cup, an annual football match in Africa organized by the Confederation of African Football (CAF), between the winners of the previous season's two CAF club competitions, the CAF Champions League and the CAF Confederation Cup.

The match was played between Mamelodi Sundowns of South Africa, the 2016 CAF Champions League winners, and TP Mazembe of the Democratic Republic of the Congo, the 2016 CAF Confederation Cup winners. It was hosted by Mamelodi Sundowns at the Loftus Versfeld Stadium in Pretoria on 18 February 2017.

Mamelodi Sundowns defeated TP Mazembe 1–0 to win their first CAF Super Cup.

Teams

Venue

Format
The CAF Super Cup was played as a single match, with the CAF Champions League winners hosting the match. If the score was tied at the end of regulation, extra time would not be played, and the penalty shoot-out would be used to determine the winner (CAF Champions League Regulations XXVII and CAF Confederation Cup Regulations XXV).

Match

Details

Prize money
The winners would receive $100,000 USD in prize money while the runners-up would receive $75,000 USD.

See also
2016 CAF Champions League Final
2016 CAF Confederation Cup Final

References

External links
Total Super Cup 2017, CAFonline.com

2017
Super
CSC
CSC
February 2017 sports events in Africa